Pataskala Presbyterian Church is a historic church at Atkinson and Main Streets in Pataskala, Ohio. It was built in 1868 and was added to the National Register in 1983.

The church congregation was founded in 1837, meeting first at a log home in "Linne Township, Ohio" [perhaps what is now Linnville, Ohio, also in Licking County?]. Then from 1852 to 1868, it met in a frame structure.  The church was constructed at a cost of $5000 in 1868.

The church was dedicated later, in 1870, its bell was hung in 1873. It was deemed significant for National Register listing "as an example of the Gothic Revival often used in churches during the mid-nineteenth century....

Expanding further, it was deemed "significant as an example of the Gothic Revival style and for its contribution to the religious history of the community. The Presbyterian religion was the earliest to be established in Pataskala and this, the second permanent building, is the largest and most architecturally distinct church with its Gothic Revival style details such as the spiralled corner bell tower, pointed arched windows and buttresses. The Presbyterian Church was organized in 1837 and was the earliest o£ the three major religions to be established in Pataskala, the other two
being the United Methodist and the Evangelical United Brethren."

It was listed on the National Register as a follow-on to a 1980 study of historic resources in Pataskala.

References

Presbyterian churches in Ohio
National Register of Historic Places in Licking County, Ohio
Gothic Revival church buildings in Ohio
Churches completed in 1868